Imaging instruments produce diagnostic images. They help in the detection of the diseases or defect (including minutest tumours) in an organ at a very early stage, when there are no clinical manifestation or the disease is undetected by the conventional methods of investigations. Then proper therapeutic or surgical measures can be adopted. The era of imaging began with the discovery of X-rays by William Roentgen. The study of X-rays for the detection and treatment of diseases is called radiology. X-rays imaging is commonly used for diagnosing diseases of heart and lungs and for detection of injuries and disorders in bones and joints.

Common imaging instruments are:
   
CT scan
PET scan
MRI scan
MEG scan
Ultrasound imaging

Medical imaging